Proscorpius (meaning 'dawn scorpion') is an extinct genus of proscorpiid scorpion that was originally thought to have been a eurypterid. Proscorpius lived during the Silurian and Devonian periods (about 422.9–416.0 ma). The type and only species, Proscorpius osborni is currently the world's oldest scorpion. It was discovered in the Lagerstätte Bertie Formation (Fiddlers Green Member); an epifaunal stratum of New York. The fossil measures roughly 3.8 cm (1.5 inches) in length, however, it is missing part of the tail, so in life the animal would be slightly longer.

See also
Gondwanascorpio

References

Prehistoric scorpions
Devonian arachnids
Paleozoic arthropods of North America
Bertie Formation